Dorothy Buffum Chandler (May 19, 1901 – July 6, 1997; born Dorothy Mae Buffum) was a Los Angeles cultural leader. She is perhaps best known for her efforts on behalf of the performing arts.

Personal life
Born Dorothy Mae Buffum (nicknamed "Buff" or "Buffie") in 1901 in La Fayette, Illinois, she moved to Long Beach, California, in 1904 with her family. Her father, Charles Abel Buffum (later mayor 1921–1924), and her uncle, Edwin, opened the first of what would become the 16-store chain of Buffums department stores.

It was during her years at Long Beach High School that two characteristics that would help determine the kind of woman Dorothy Buffum Chandler would become were first evidenced:  She liked competition, especially against members of the opposite sex, and she had a recurring feeling, a “sense,” really, of time slipping away while things that needed doing went undone. She was a good sprinter in high school, and looked on male students not so much as potential escorts but as objects of competition. “I didn’t take to boys much except to run against them and beat them,” she once said.

She attended Stanford University, where at a school dance she met Norman Chandler, eldest son of the family that had published the Los Angeles Times since 1883 and was a significant social and political force in the area. She was a member of Pi Beta Phi sorority. The two married in 1922, and had two children, Camilla and Otis, both born in 1927. At the time of her death in 1997, she had eight grandchildren and 14 great-grandchildren.

In 1945, her husband became publisher of the Times, a position he held until he was succeeded by their son, Otis, in 1960. Norman Chandler died in 1973. Dorothy Chandler never remarried.

Los Tiempos (the Times) was Norman and Buff's grand house on Lorraine Blvd. in Windsor Square, Los Angeles, where she lived until her death.

Career

Times Mirror Company
Chandler worked at the Times or its parent, the Times Mirror Company, from 1948 to 1976. She was a director of Times Mirror from 1955 until 1973, when she was named director emeritus.

She initiated the Times Woman of the Year award, which was given to 243 women from 1950 through 1976.

Other Volunteer work 
In 1956, President Dwight D. Eisenhower appointed Mrs. Chandler to his Committee on Education Beyond the High School and, in 1964, President Lyndon B. Johnson named her to the U.S. Advisory Commission on Information.

Fundraising for the Arts
As the wife of the publisher of the city's leading newspaper, Dorothy Chandler became active in Los Angeles cultural circles.

In 1950, a financial crisis closed the Hollywood Bowl during its summer season. Chandler chaired a committee that organized a series of fundraising concerts that was able to reopen it, and she later served as president of its parent organization, the Southern California Symphony Association.

From this early success, she started a longer effort to build a performing arts center for Los Angeles. In 1955 she raised $400,000 at a benefit concert at the Ambassador Hotel featuring Dinah Shore, Danny Kaye and Jack Benny. This fundraiser began a nine-year crusade that raised some $20 million of the estimated $35 million total cost; the remainder was paid through private bond sales.

Mrs. Chandler sought funds from both the long established “old money” families of Pasadena, but also to “new money” sources on the city's Westside and Hollywood, many of whom were Jewish. “Before the Music Center,” said the late attorney Paul Ziffren, “Jews were not a part of the social life of this community.” Mrs. Chandler, he said, “was primarily responsible for opening up this community in terms of Jews and Gentiles."

She was featured on the cover of the December 18, 1964, issue of Time magazine, which praised her fundraising efforts as "perhaps the most impressive display of virtuoso money-raising and civic citizenship in the history of U.S. womanhood."

The Los Angeles Music Center held its first performance on December 6, 1964. The 24- year old conductor that Chandler hired, Zubin Mehta, led the Los Angeles Philharmonic orchestra. "We have given it bricks and mortar. Now we must give it a soul", Mrs. Chandler opined that evening.

The complex was completed in 1967, consisting of three venues: the Dorothy Chandler Pavilion, named in honor of Chandler, the Mark Taper Forum and the Ahmanson Theatre. The Chandler Pavilion served as the home of the Los Angeles Philharmonic from 1964 until 2003, when the Music Center opened its fourth hall, the Walt Disney Concert Hall.

Writing in “The Powers That Be,” David Halberstam said Mrs. Chandler was a “woman before her time. A feminist in pioneer country. Always, above all else, a presence.”

Former Mayor Tom Bradley declared her “a giant in the cultural life of Los Angeles. We shall always remember her whenever we see the Music Center, knowing that without her vision and energetic leadership, it would not have been built in our lifetime.

On September 17, 2005, the Walt Disney Concert Hall held a Dorothy Chandler memorial concert.

Higher education
Chandler served as a regent and chairwoman of the Building Committee of the University of California from 1954 to 1968, during its period of most rapid growth, when the system grew from five to nine campuses. She also served as a trustee of Occidental College from 1952 to 1967.

Awards
 1971: the Herbert Hoover Medal for Distinguished Service, awarded by the Stanford University Alumni Assn.
1974: Humanitarian Award from Variety Clubs International
 1982: UCLA Medal from the University of California, Los Angeles
 1985: National Medal of Arts from the National Endowment for the Arts

References

External links

 Los Angeles Music Center, biography
 Historical Society of Southern California, biography by Albert Greenstein, 1999
Los Angeles Times Obituary

 

1901 births
1997 deaths
Otis family
History of Los Angeles
People from Los Angeles
Philanthropists from California
United States National Medal of Arts recipients
University of California regents
American women in business
20th-century American philanthropists
20th-century American women
20th-century American people
Chandler family (newspaper publishers)
People from Stark County, Illinois
People from Long Beach, California
Stanford University alumni
Long Beach Polytechnic High School alumni